The Lupa was an Ottoman galley ship, the flagship of Mustapha Basha, Commander of the Turkish Galleys of Rhodes. It is notable for being the site of a slave revolt by its galley slaves in 1748.

Slave uprising 
Hungarian, Georgian and Maltese slaves on board the ship Lupa revolted and sailed the ship to Malta.

See also
 Corona Ottomana

References

Galleys
18th-century ships
Age of Sail naval ships of the Ottoman Empire
Slavery in the Ottoman Empire
Maritime incidents in 1748
Slave rebellions in Europe
Captured ships
1740s in Malta